Baha-ad-Din Iran-Shah ibn Turan-Shah (Persian: بهاالدین ایران شاه, ruled from 1096 until 1101), or better simply known as Iran-Shah, was one of the Seljuk rulers of Kerman. During his reign, his kingdom had been heavily reduced and only extended in Kerman and its surroundings. It was reported that he was killed by the Nizari Ismailis, the arch-rivals of the Seljuks.

References 
Seljuk rulers
Rulers of Kerman
People of the Nizari–Seljuk wars